Store Memurutinden is the eighth-highest mountain in Norway. It is in Lom Municipality in Innlandet county, Norway. The mountain is surrounded by several other notable mountains including Leirhøi, Veobreahesten, and Veobretinden to the north; Veotinden to the northeast; Austre Memurutinden to the east; Blåbreahøe and Surtningssue to the southeast; Reinstinden to the south; Søre Hellstugutinden, Nestsøre Hellstugutinden, Store Hellstugutinden, and Midtre Hellstugutinden to the southwest; and Nordre Hellstugutinden to the west.

Name
The first element is the old name of the river Memuru (now called the Muru). The last element is the finite form of tind which means 'mountain peak'. The river name is derived from the verb mara which means 'dig' - the first element Me- is from Old Norse mið meaning 'in the middle', because the mouth of the river is almost exactly at the middle of the lake Gjendin. The first word store means 'the big'.

See also
List of mountains of Norway by height

References

Jotunheimen
Lom, Norway
Mountains of Innlandet